The eighth season of CSI: Miami premiered on CBS on September 21, 2009 and ended May 24, 2010. The series stars David Caruso and Emily Procter.

Description 
It's all change during the eighth season of CSI: Miami as the team faces the loss of one of their own and flash back to 1997. Delko departs, joining the State's Attorney as an investigator, forcing him to return to the lab undercover; Calleigh finds herself facing death once again, as the spirit of a victim helps her solve his own homicide; Horatio's ex-girlfriend is killed in an explosion, whilst the crime lab comes under siege from hostage takers. It's ultimately high-tech crime that cripples the team this season, however, as they are methodically taken down by a serial killer they're hunting, with one CSI paying the ultimate price.

Cast

Main cast 
 David Caruso as Horatio Caine; a CSI Lieutenant and the Director of the MDPD Crime Lab.
 Emily Procter as Calleigh Duquesne; a veteran CSI Detective, the CSI Assistant Supervisor and a ballistics expert.
 Adam Rodriguez as Eric Delko; a CSI Detective and Wolfe's partner. (Episodes 1-5)
 Jonathan Togo as Ryan Wolfe; a CSI Detective and Delko's partner.
 Rex Linn as Frank Tripp; a senior Robbery-Homicide Division (RHD) Detective assigned to assist the CSI's.
 Eva LaRue as Natalia Boa Vista; a CSI Detective.
 Omar Benson Miller as Walter Simmons; an art-theft specialist and CSI Detective. (Episodes 6- 24)
 Eddie Cibrian as Jesse Cardoza; a founding member of the MDPD's CSI team.

Recurring cast 
Khandi Alexander as Alexx Woods; a physician.
Malcolm McDowell as Darren Vogel; an Attorney and a nemesis of the CSIs.
Johnny Whitworth as Jake Berkeley; an undercover MDPD Narcotics Detective.
Evan Ellingson as Kyle Harmon; Horatio's son.
Christian Clemenson as Tom Loman; the team's Medical Examiner.
David Lee Smith as Rick Stetler; an IAB officer.
Adam Rodriguez as Eric Delko

Guest stars 
Laurence Fishburne as Ray Langston; a Las Vegas CSI.

Episodes

References

08
2009 American television seasons
2010 American television seasons